I Love Hip Hop in Morocco is a 2007 film by Josh Asen who decided to film hip hop in Morocco with his friend Jennifer Needle. While interviewing Moroccan hip hop artists, they told him that they needed concerts to promote their music. Asen managed to get the U.S. Embassy and Coca-Cola to sponsor a music festival.

Groups of musicians started the country's first hip hop tour in three Moroccan cities - Meknes, Marrakesh, and Casablanca. The three concerts brought in thousands of audience members.

The film ended up as a  2007 documentary about the musicians' struggles and what it is like to rap in a Muslim country. The documentary mainly focuses on DJ Key, H-Kayne, Bigg, Fati Show, and the hip hop group Fnaire.

References

Concert films
American documentary films
2000s American films